Yitzhak Ze'ev Pindrus (born 20 July 1971) is an Israeli politician currently serving as a member of the Knesset for United Torah Judaism.

Biography
Pindrus is the eldest son of American immigrants Moshe and Zelda, who moved to Israel and settled in Jerusalem. He attended Yeshivat Aderet Eliyahu, before marrying at the age of 19 and moving to the Beitar Illit settlement. Between 1991 and 1996 he worked as an advisor to Moshe Leibovitz, the head of Beitar Illit local council, before being elected deputy leader of the council in 1996 on behalf of Degel HaTorah.

In 2001 Pindrus ran for mayor of Beitar Illit, unseating the incumbent mayor Yehuda Gerlitz. Pindrus won by just 162 votes after he received 2,688 votes to Gerlitz's 2,526. In 2007, Pindrus lost the mayoral election to Meir Rubinstein. After his election defeat as mayor of Beitar Illit, Pindrus moved back to the Old City of Jerusalem, where he lives with his wife and six children. He is fluent in Hebrew, English, and Yiddish. He subsequently became a member of Jerusalem City Council in 2008, becoming deputy mayor and portfolio holder for sanitation and city improvements. He was eighteenth on the United Torah Judaism list (an alliance of Degel HaTorah and Agudat Yisrael) for the 2013 elections, but the alliance won only seven seats. He was twenty-second on the list for the 2015 Knesset elections, in which UTJ won six seats. In 2016 he became acting mayor of Jerusalem.

Prior to the 2018 local elections he resigned from Jerusalem City Council and as deputy mayor in order to contest the mayoral election in El'ad. However, he was subsequently barred from contesting the elections as he was not a permanent resident of the city. In the build-up to the April 2019 Knesset elections he was placed eighth on the UTJ list. He was subsequently elected to the Knesset as the faction won eight seats. However, he lost his seat in the September 2019 elections when UTJ was reduced to seven seats. He re-entered the Knesset in June 2020 as a replacement for Meir Porush, who had resigned under the Norwegian Law after being appointed to the cabinet.

Views and opinions
 Conversion to Judaism through the IDF — Pindrus has publicly opposed the validity of conversion to Judaism conducted through an Israeli military program. In a panel on religion and state held by ITIM: Resources and Advocacy for Jewish Life and the 'Kippah' website held prior to the 2021 Israeli Knesset elections, Pindrus said that he did not recognize the Judaism of IDF Nativ graduates, despite their approval by the Chief Rabbinate. Pindrus later apologized on Israel's Channel 12 for his use of the term “shiksa” when referring to women who converted to Judaism through the IDF. Pindrus said the use of the term was not appropriate, although he continued to insist that these women were not Jewish according to halakha. Pidrus was reportedly criticized by MK Yair Lapid who responded that Pindrus' view was reflective of his ignorance of the commitment of these women to preserving Jewish life in Israel.
 Women's prayer at the Western Wall — Pindrus reportedly helped organize Haredi opposition campaign against Women of the Wall, a pluralistic Jewish prayer group at the Western Wall.
 Death penalty for rapists - Pindrus has publicly expressed support for rapists to be "shot at point blank range."

References

External links

1971 births
Living people
Degel HaTorah politicians
Deputy Mayors of Jerusalem
Israeli Ashkenazi Jews
Israeli Orthodox Jews
Israeli people of American-Jewish descent
Israeli settlers
Jewish Israeli politicians
Mayors of places in Israel
Members of the 21st Knesset (2019)
Members of the 23rd Knesset (2020–2021)
Members of the 24th Knesset (2021–2022)
Members of the 25th Knesset (2022–)
Politicians from Jerusalem
United Torah Judaism politicians